The Mendocino AVA is an American Viticultural Area encompassing Mendocino County, California within the vast North Coast AVA.  Within the appellation are several small AVAs, and applications are pending with the United States Department of the Treasury Alcohol and Tobacco Tax and Trade Bureau to create AVAs in the Sanel and Ukiah valleys along the Russian River.  The Mendocino AVA is known for the cultivation of Mediterranean climate grapes including Carignan, Charbono, Grenache, Petite Sirah, Syrah and Zinfandel.  The cooler climate in the Anderson Valley is known for its Pinot noir and sparkling wine production. Many wineries in nearby Sonoma and Napa counties purchase Mendocino grapes to blend into wines labeled with other appellations.

References

External links
 Mendocino County AVAs and Wine Regions 

American Viticultural Areas
American Viticultural Areas of California
American Viticultural Areas of Mendocino County, California
1984 establishments in California